The National Engineering School of Bizerte (ENIB) is a Tunisian engineering school based in the city of Bizerte located in the north of the country. It is part of the Carthage University.

Establishment
The National Engineering School of Bizerte was founded in 2009.

Departments  
The National Engineering School of Bizerte has three independent departments: 
 Mechanical engineering
 Industrial engineering
 Civil engineering

See also 
 National Engineering School of Tunis
 National Engineering School of Monastir
 National Engineering School of Sousse
 National Engineering School of Carthage
 National Engineering School of Sfax
 National Engineering School of Gabès
 National Engineering School of Gafsa
 Carthage University

References 

Universities in Tunisia
2009 establishments in Tunisia